New Zealanders in the United Kingdom are citizens or residents of the United Kingdom who originate from New Zealand.

Population
According to the 2001 UK Census, 58,286 New Zealand-born people were residing in the United Kingdom. The 2011 census recorded 57,076 people born in New Zealand residing in England, 1,292 in Wales, 3,632 in Scotland and 584 in Northern Ireland. The Office for National Statistics estimates that, in 2015, the New Zealand-born population of the UK stood at around 59,000.

Around 80 per cent of New Zealanders have some British ancestry and an estimated 17 per cent are entitled to British nationality by descent.

Distribution
Every one of the top ten most popular places in Britain for New Zealand expatriates is in London, Acton being home to 1,045 New Zealand-born people (representing 0.7 per cent of the local population), with Hammersmith, Brondesbury, Hyde Park, Cricklewood and Fulham following.

Māori

According to Te Ara: The Encyclopedia of New Zealand, at the start of the millennium, approximately 8,000 Māori resided in England alone (as opposed to the United Kingdom as a whole). Historically Māori have been known in the UK for their athletic prowess on the rugby field as well as their various artistic skills. In the 1900s, Māori artistic performers toured the UK and some of them decided to stay. During World War I, significant numbers of Māori troops came to the UK in order to help fight with the British Army (at this period military service was one of the main reasons for Māori emigration). Many of these were actually housed in Papakura's Oxfordshire mansion. Later on in the 1950s, a small group of Māori residing in the British capital established the London Māori Club. The aim was to promote Māori culture through the performance of traditional songs and war dances. In 1971 the group renamed itself  Māori Club. To this day the  cultural group hosts weekly meetings, language classes and celebrations.

Notable New Zealanders in Britain

See also
 Australians in the United Kingdom
 British New Zealander
 Demographics of New Zealand
 Māori
Fijians in the United Kingdom

References

External links
Maori.org.uk, a portal dedicated to the UK Māori community
Te Kohanga Reo O Ranana
Ngāti Rānana London Māori Club aims to provide an environment to teach, learn and participate in Māori culture
Maramara Tōtara teaches the Māori fighting art of Mau Taiaha in London

 
 
Immigration to the United Kingdom by country of origin
United Kingdom
New Zealand diaspora in Europe